360° (sometimes credited as 360 Degrees or simply 360) is the debut studio album by Puerto Rican recording artist Chelo, released in 2006.  The following singles from this album include "Yummy" and "Un Corazón". The album is recorded in Spanglish.

Track listing

Notes
 A^  This song contains a sample of "La Murga" as performed by Hector Lavoe.
 B^ A remixed version of this song was also released featuring Too $hort

Personnel
Adapted from the 360° media notes.

 Don C. Tyler: mastering (Precision Mastering, L.A.)
 Linda Crespo: art direction, project manager
 Bryan Pérez: project manager
 Erika Nuño: A&R coordinator
 Raúl Vega: photography
 Sam Riddle: management

Chart positions

Album

References

2006 debut albums
Sony BMG Norte albums